Akyazı is a village in the Amasya District, Amasya Province, Turkey. Its population is 74 (2021).

Geography
The village lies near the border with Tokat Province, to the southeast of Musaköy,  by road south of the district capital of Amasya.

Demographics
In 2012 the village had a population of 41 people. It has a severely declining population. In 1985 it had 296 people, and in 2000 it had 92 people.

References

Villages in Amasya District